This list contains the names of albums that contain a hidden track and also information on how to find them. Not all printings of an album contain the same track arrangements, so some copies of a particular album may not have the hidden track(s) listed below. Some of these tracks may be hidden in the pregap, and some hidden simply as a track following the listed tracks. The list is ordered by artist name using the surname where appropriate.

 (216), Two One Six: Unlisted hidden track 21 "Without A Fight (Remix)" (tracks 9-20 have no audio content).
 2 Many DJs, As Heard on Radio Soulwax Pt. 2 : "Can't Get You Out of My Head"; Remix of Kylie Minogue's song. Found in the pregap; rewind from the beginning of track one.
 3 Doors Down, Away from the Sun: "This Time" after the final track
 (les) Trois Fromages, Et puis zet: Something is hidden in the HTOA track. Not really a song, more like an improvised sketch.
 The 1975, IV: "You" is labeled as a ghost track on digital versions. This track is only available on the American edition.
 Thirty Seconds to Mars, 30 Seconds to Mars: Contains hidden track "The Struggle". (also called "Hidden to Label")
 3OH!3, Streets of Gold: After the last song "Love 2012" ends, there is a couple of seconds of silence before a hidden outro starts.
 311, Stereolithic: Hidden track 16 after "Tranquility".

See also
 List of backmasked messages
 List of albums with tracks hidden in the pregap

References 

0